State Route 29 (SR 29) is a state highway in the U.S. state of California that travels from Interstate 80 in Vallejo north to State Route 20 in Upper Lake. It serves as the primary road through the Napa Valley, providing access to the Lake County region to the north and the rest of the San Francisco Bay Area to the south.

Route description

SR 29 begins at Interstate 80 (I-80) just north of the Carquinez Bridge in Vallejo. After running through the downtown area of Vallejo, it travels as a four-lane expressway (on some segments, five) through American Canyon to Napa. It then briefly becomes a freeway as it passes through Napa.

The expressway continues through the southern Napa Valley before terminating in Yountville. SR 29 continues as a 2-lane road through the Napa Valley cities of Oakville, Rutherford, St. Helena, and Calistoga, while also passing many of the region's notable vineyards and wineries. This portion of the highway is often heavily congested with rental cars and tour buses in spring and summer, when tourists flock to Napa Valley.

North of Calistoga, SR 29 climbs Mount Saint Helena, an extinct volcano, at the border between Napa County and Lake County. The road then heads north to Middletown and Lower Lake before going around the southern and western sides of Clear Lake, the largest natural freshwater lake completely within California. In Lakeport, SR 29 becomes a freeway as it bypasses the city. It then reverts as a two-lane highway before it terminates at Route 20 in Upper Lake.

Points of interest along Route 29 include Bothe-Napa Valley State Park, Bale Grist Mill State Historic Park, Robert Louis Stevenson State Park, the  St. Helena Toll Road and Bull Trail, the Stone House, and the Lower Lake Stone Jail.

SR 29 is part of the California Freeway and Expressway System south of the intersection of Oak Knoll Avenue (approximately 1 mile north of the Napa city limits), and south of Yountville and north of SR 53 is part of the National Highway System, a network of highways that are considered essential to the country's economy, defense, and mobility by the Federal Highway Administration. SR 29 is eligible for inclusion in the State Scenic Highway System, but it is not officially designated as a scenic highway by the California Department of Transportation.

History
Historically, the route between the Napa Valley and Middletown was served by the Old Bull Trail Road, built by volunteers in the 1850s, that had grades of up to 35 percent. In 1868, this was replaced by the St. Helena Toll Road, which had more manageable inclines of up to 12 percent. The State of California purchased the toll road in 1925.

Major intersections

See also

References

External links

California @ AARoads - State Route 29
Caltrans: Route 29 highway conditions
California Highways: SR 29
Cal-NExUS: Route 29 North
Cal-NExUS: Route 29 South

029
029
029
State Route 029
State Route 029
State Route 029
Lower Lake, California